Juan Sebastián Cabal and Robert Farah were the defending Champions, but both decided not to participate.
Júlio César Campozano and Roberto Quiroz won the title after defeating Marcel Felder and Rodrigo Grilli 6–4, 6–1 in the final.

Seeds

Draw

Draw

References
 Main Draw

Challenger Ciudad de Guayaquil - Doubles
2011 Doubles